Deh-e Sheykh (also Romanized as Deh-e Sheykh, Deh Shaikh, and Deh Sheykh; also known as Deh-e Sheykh Arzū’īyeh and Deh Sheikh Arzoo’eyeh) is a village in Arzuiyeh Rural District, in the Central District of Arzuiyeh County, Kerman Province, Iran. At the 2006 census, its population was 213, in 55 families.

References 

Populated places in Arzuiyeh County